Bowling Township is located in Rock Island County, Illinois. As of the 2010 census, its population was 3,414 and it contained 1,455 housing units.

Geography

Demographics

References

External links
City-data.com
Illinois State Archives

Townships in Rock Island County, Illinois
Townships in Illinois